The Capital Traction Company was the smaller of the two major street railway companies in Washington, D.C., in the early 20th century. It was formed in 1895 through a merger of the Rock Creek Railway and the Washington and Georgetown Railroad Company. The company's streetcars connected the Washington, D.C., neighborhoods of Georgetown, Capitol Hill, the Armory, and Mount Pleasant; and the suburb of Chevy Chase, Maryland. In 1933, it merged with its major competitor, the Washington Railway and Electric Company, to form the Capital Transit Company.

Origins
In the mid-1890s, numerous streetcar companies operated in the District. Congress tried to deal with this fractured transit system by requiring them to accept transfers and set standard pricing, and by allowing them to use one another's track. But eventually it became clear that consolidation was the best solution.

On March 1, 1895, Congress authorized the Rock Creek Railway to purchase and merge with any connecting company, and to change its name to the Capital Traction Company. The company consequently merged with the Washington and Georgetown on September 21, 1895.

In that same year, Capital Traction began construction on a Waddy Wood-designed car barn in Georgetown to be called Union Station. Union Station was designed to serve four streetcar companies: The old Washington and Georgetown lines would use the ground floor on M Street NW while the Washington, Arlington and Falls Church and the projected Great Falls and Old Dominion were to come across the Potomac from Rosslyn entering the second and third floors respectively on steel trestles. The Metropolitan would use the roof. In reality, the Virginia companies never used it and the Metropolitan only sparingly so. The Washington and Great Falls took over the third floor. The station opened on May 27, 1897, and contained Washington's only cable loop.

In 1896, the former Rock Creek line experimented with a new power system on U Street NW between 9th Street NW and 18th Street NW. The Love system transmitted electricity through a set of trolley wheels running on underground conduit rails instead of through the sliding shoe used elsewhere. While the system worked it was more expensive to install. In the spring of 1899 it was replaced with the sliding shoe and the line continued to the Calvert Street Loop.  See also Conduit current collection.

On September 29, 1897, the Capital Traction Company's powerhouse at 14th and E NW burned down and the city took the site for its Municipal Building. The company replaced the cable cars it served with an electric system, using horses in the interim. The electric wire for the cars was placed in the old cable system's underground conduit. The 14th Street branch switched to electric power on February 27, 1898, the Pennsylvania Avenue division on April 20, 1898 (March 20 west of the Capitol), and the 7th Street branch on May 26, 1898.
The place where cars changed between Capital Traction and Metropolitan was initially located at U and 18th Streets. It was moved to just east of the bridge over Rock Creek - to the Calvert Street Loop - in the spring of 1899 when the conduit system was changed to the more standard and less expensive contact shoe. The old line on Florida Avenue between 18th and Connecticut was discontinued that year and the track removed.

Expansion

In 1906 Capital Traction built the Decatur Street Car barn and extended the 14th Street line north to reach it. Further expansion came with Congressional approval on May 23, 1908.  First, three new connections were built to serve the new Union Station east of downtown. Connections were made from New Jersey Avenue, F Street NE and from the spur to the B&O station. Second, a new crosstown line was laid down on Florida Avenue to Gallaudet University and south along Eighth Street where it connected to the Pennsylvania Avenue line and the Navy Yard. Trains began serving Union Station on June 24, 1908, and the other lines were completed soon thereafter. During this time the 14th street line was expanded north to Colorado Avenue where it connected with the Baltimore and Washington Transit Company's Kennedy Avenue line.

In 1910, Capital Traction began construction on a power house in Georgetown to power its streetcars. The facility opened on the waterfront in 1912.

In 1916 Capital Traction took ownership of the Washington and Maryland and its  of track.

Streetcars were unionized in 1916 when local 689 of the Amalgamated Association of Street, Electric Railway and Motor Coach Employees of America won recognition after a three-day strike.

The end of the line
 
The North American Company, a transit and utilities holding company, began to acquire stock in Washington Railway in 1922, gaining a controlling interest by 1928. By December 31, 1933, it owned 50.016% of the voting stock. 

North American tried to purchase Capital Traction as well, but Capital Traction always remained widely owned by the residents of Washington, without a principal stock holder. North American never owned more than 2.5% of Capital Traction stock.

The Great Depression hurt transit companies' revenue. On December 1, 1933 Washington Railway, Capital Traction, and Washington Rapid Transit merged to form the Capital Transit Company. Washington Railway continued as a holding company, owning 50% of Capital Transit and 100% of PEPCO, but Capital Traction was dissolved. For the first time, street railways in Washington were under the management of one company.

Today, parts of the former lines are run by various Metrobus Routes.

References

Street railways in Washington, D.C.
Defunct Maryland railroads
Defunct Washington, D.C., railroads